Saeed Mohammad Saeed Hasan Murjan (born in 1990) is a Jordanian professional footballer who plays as a midfielder for Jordanian club Ma'an and the Jordan national football team.

International career
Saeed's first international match with his national team Jordan was against Congo in an international friendly at Amman on 27 May 2009 which ended in a 1–1 draw.

International goals

With U-21

With senior team
Scores and results list Jordan's goal tally first.

References

External links 
  
 
 

1990 births
Living people
Jordanian footballers
Jordan international footballers
Association football midfielders
2011 AFC Asian Cup players
2015 AFC Asian Cup players
Al-Arabi (Jordan) players
Al-Wehdat SC players
Al-Ramtha SC players
Kazma SC players
Al-Faisaly SC players
Ma'an SC players
Jordanian Pro League players
Expatriate footballers in Kuwait
Jordanian expatriate footballers
Jordanian expatriate sportspeople in Kuwait
2019 AFC Asian Cup players
Kuwait Premier League players